Clash of Egos is a 2006 Danish comedy film directed by Tomas Villum Jensen, and written by Anders Thomas Jensen.

Plot 
Clash of Egos stars Ulrich Thomsen as Tonny, an aggressive husband and father so rage-addled that he got sent to jail for KO'ing a man in public. Tonny's wife, Tanja (Ellen Hillingso), grew humiliated and promptly divorced him, but Tonny luckily managed to swing occasional custody of his two children. On one of their prized afternoons together, Tonny and the kids hearken off to see the new Harry Potter movie, but run headfirst into the discouraging news that the film is sold out. With only one other option available to them at the cinema, the three must endure a thoroughly miserable afternoon at an über-pretentious experimental Danish film called "The Murderer," directed by the snotty passive aggressive artiste director Claus Volter (Nikolaj Lie Kaas). Frustrated, Tonny smashes a display case in the cinema lobby (and barely manages to escape re-incarceration for it), this leads him to lose his custodial session with his children's. Hence he decides to track Volter down for a refund of their cost for seeing the film. Tom finds Volter in a film set shooting final film of the trilogy. Volter pushes Tom in a frantic response, and lands on a litigation. Tom only asks for his money spend for seeing Volter's early film and wants to be the co-writer and co-director of Volter's new film. Volter finds this as disrupting his "artistic" expression, but compromises for his Producer (Kristian Halken). Tom with help of his love (Line Kruse) re-writes the whole script with the intention of making something enjoyable for him and his children. Volter tries to bring artistic interpretation to the film, but Tom, the producer and the lead actress (Mille Dinesen) dislikes it and follows Tom's way of commercial filming. Volter removes his name from the film and botches the editing of the film. The film appears to be jaunty and disconnected, but the critics love it and gives maximum rating. Volter finds the paradox in this and gives money to Tom as a debt he is paying for watching his previous film. Tom finally as any artist finds his film not as good as he expected and goes out with his love to see a decent film and plans to lead a quiet life.

Cast 
 Ulrich Thomsen - Tonny
 Nikolaj Lie Kaas - Claus Volter
 Line Kruse - Clara
 Mille Dinesen - Pernille
 Lars Brygmann - Tim Holstein
 Kristian Halken - Per Schack
 Nicolaj Kopernikus - Jan Godtfredsen
 Jakob Cedergren - Allan Henriksen
 Niels Olsen - Brormand
 Ellen Hillingsø - Tanja

References

External links 

2006 comedy films
2006 films
Danish thriller films
Danish comedy films
Films with screenplays by Anders Thomas Jensen